Aquinas College is a Roman Catholic sixth form college in Stockport, Greater Manchester, England. The college also offers a range of adult education courses.

History

The college was established in 1980 by the Diocese of Shrewsbury and is named after St. Thomas Aquinas. The college was opened on the site of St. Michael's Secondary School.

Ambrose Smith was the college principal from 1989 to 2011. During his tenure the college was so popular among school leavers in the Stockport area that it received twice as many applications as there were places. During this time the college expanded from 400 to 2000 students. In 2010 a new main building was opened. In 2011 Danny Pearson succeeded Ambrose Smith as principal.

The College was rated as "Good" at its most recent Ofsted inspection, which was carried out in 2017.

Notable alumni  

 Sacha Dhawan, actor
 Dominic Monaghan, actor
 Kate Richardson-Walsh, field hockey player
 Matt Walker, Paralympic swimmer

References

External links
 

Schools in Stockport
Catholic universities and colleges in England
Buildings and structures in Stockport
Education in the Metropolitan Borough of Stockport
Sixth form colleges in Greater Manchester
Educational institutions established in 1980
1980 establishments in England
Catholic secondary schools in the Diocese of Shrewsbury